TV dober dan is a Slovenian television sitcom that aired on POP TV. Filming began in August 1999, the series debuted in October 1999 and concluded in May 2002, after more than 80 episodes.

Cast 
 Ana Ban (Tjaša Železnik)
 Samo Kral (Primož Ekart)
 Miran Podrepnik (Kondi Pižorn)
 Frane Merkatori (Jernej Kuntner)
 Zofka Mlakar (Barica Blenkuš)
 Jože (Janez Cankar)
 Mr. Johnny Smith (Damjan Perne)
 Izidor (Matjaž Javšnik)
 Luka Jazbec (Vito Rožej)
 Ingrid Babnik (Alenka Kozolc)
 Fata (Lucija Ćirović)
 Valentin Zois (Peter Musevski)
 Amanda (Iva Babić)

Slovenian television series
1990s Slovenian television series
2000s Slovenian television series
1999 Slovenian television series debuts
2002 Slovenian television series endings
Pop (Slovenian TV channel) original programming